Fino Factories and California Soups (in ) was a Dutch-American food company that produced soup stock, chicken boullion, vegetable seasoning, and gravy base from 1928 until 2009. The ways in which the company employed its brands "Fino" and "California" changed with time and place.

History 
The Fino company was founded in Harderwijk, Netherlands in 1928 by Egbert J. Holtrust. The company employed the brands "Fino" and "California" differently based on location and various product designations changed over time as well. In the Netherlands, the Fino brand was used both for manufacturing and retail products from 1922 to 1973. After 1973, "Fino" only designated the factory whereas "California" was the brand used on the products. In 1952, Fino expanded into the United States, trademarking the brand name "California" for its US products. For the full duration of the company's operations into the United States, "Fino" always designated the manufacturing branch and "California" designated the company's retail brand.

Throughout its history, Fino was registered as a naamloze vennootschap, which is a Dutch legal designation for a joint-stock company. In 1965, Organon International instigated a partial merge with Fino. In 1973, California became the primary name for all products produced in the Fino factory. In 2009, Struik Foods Europe purchased California Soepen and discontinued distribution of its former products.

Cookbooks 
Throughout its existence, the Fino company published several cookbooks with recipes advising how to best use their products. In 1941, for example, Fino published De Fino Kook-Gids: Met Verschillende Smakelijke Recepten (in English: The Fino Cooking Guide with Different Tasty Recipes). At this time, Fino had not yet expanded into the American market. In 1973, Fino published De Plezierige Keuken (in English: The Pleasant Kitchen).

Legacy 
The Fino company has been recognized for the role it played in the province of Gelderland during the Dutch Famine of 1944-45, commonly known as "the Hunger Winter." According to Dutch scholar Henri A. Van Der Zee, the Fino company fed "3000 people - a total of 150,000 people during the whole winter."

In 2010, a monumental plaque was installed in Harderwijk to commemorate the role that Fino played in the Hunger Winter.

Products

Fino products 

 Stock
 Boullion
 Boullion cubes
 Gravy base

California products 
 Groentesoup Potage Legumes
 Tomatensoep met soepballetjes
 Soepen Potage
 één kops Tomaat
 één kops Kip
 Potage Pois
 Erwtensoep

Gallery

References

External links 
 California Soup distribution

Dutch brands